Corydoras geoffroy is a tropical freshwater fish belonging to the Corydoradinae sub-family of the family Callichthyidae.  It originates in coastal rivers in South America, and is found in Suriname and French Guiana.

It is the type species of the genus Corydoras.

The fish will grow in length up to 2.8 inches (7.0 centimeters).  It lives in a tropical climate in water with a 6.0 – 8.0 pH, a water hardness of 2 – 25 dGH, and a temperature range of 72 – 79 °F (22 – 26 °C). It feeds on worms, benthic crustaceans, insects, and plant matter.  It lays eggs in dense vegetation and adults do not guard the eggs.

Etymology
The fish is named in honor of Lacépède's colleague Étienne Geoffroy Saint-Hilaire (1772-1844), for his observations of the various animals of Egypt, and in particular the fishes of the Nile.

See also 
 List of freshwater aquarium fish species

References 

 

Corydoras
Fish of French Guiana
Fish of Suriname
Fish described in 1803
Taxa named by Bernard Germain de Lacépède